Suman Sridhar  is a singer, songwriter, and actor. Sridhar works in music, performance art, theatre and film. She co-produced and acted in her debut feature film Ajeeb Aashiq/Strange Love by filmmaker Natasha Mendonca which premiered at the International Film Festival Rotterdam, 2016 and received the Bright Future Award nomination  and the jury prize at the Lesbisch Schwule Filmtage Hamburg International Queer Film Festival. Suman is trained in Bharat Natyam classical dance and Indian Classical music and studied Western Classical Music, Women's & Gender Studies and Visual Arts from Mason Gross Rutgers University, USA. Suman has sung chart topping Bollywood film songs. Her performances include venues like National Centre for the Performing Arts (India), Southbank Centre (UK), BBC- World Service (UK), MTV India, Sound Trek (Fox Traveller India), NH7 Weekender (India), Radio Mirchi Music Awards (India), Mijwan Fashion Show (India), Jazzmandu (Nepal), Galle Literary Festival (Sri Lanka), The Quarter: Royal Opera House (India), The Great Escape Festival (UK), One Billion Rising (India) etc.

Her work has been part of art exhibitions such as Transformation 19124 (Philadelphia), Sarai Reader 09 (India), What Happened 2081? (German) and Between the Waves at dOCUMENTA (13) (Germany). Suman has produced, written and performed in original works such as Yoni Ki Baat (South Asian Women's Collective, USA), The Flying Wallas: Opera Noir (Prithvi Theatre Festival, India) Fall In Line and All That Remains is Flight: a conversation between Sappho and Medusa.
Suman is one half of the audio-visual music duo The Black Mamba  which inaugurated the 20th Contemporary Arts Festival, VideoBrasil_Sesc, São Paulo (2017) the Kochi Muziris Biennale, India (2016) and headlined at the Ziro Music festival, India (2016). The Black Mamba's live cinema piece Land of the Breasted Woman won a Sesc_Videobrasil residency prize at the Wexner Center for the Arts (USA) and had a screening at the 11th Berlin Biennale for Contemporary Art.

Career 

In its 2014 listing of "25 Greatest Indian Rock Songs of the last 25 Years", Rolling Stone India featured Punk Bhajan.

Filmography

Awards

References 

Bollywood playback singers
Living people
American women singers of Indian descent
Rutgers University alumni
21st-century Indian singers
Songwriters from New Jersey
21st-century American women singers
21st-century American singers
Year of birth missing (living people)